British European Airways Flight 530, also known as the Mistberget Accident, was a controlled flight into terrain of a Douglas C-47 Skytrain into the Mistberget mountain in Eidsvoll, Norway, on 7 August 1946 at ca. 14:00. The British European Airways (BEA) aircraft was en route on a scheduled flight from London's Croydon Airport and crashed during approach to Oslo Airport, Gardermoen.

Three of the five crew members were killed in the accident and all ten passengers survived, though two were seriously injured, the remainder were able to walk away from the crash. The investigation found no faults with the aircraft, but cited a navigation error caused by a combination of insufficient training and shortcomings in the aircraft's low frequency radio range equipment.

Flight
The accident aircraft was a Douglas C-47A-5-DK Skytrain, c/n 12348 and registered G-AHCS, equipped with two Pratt & Whitney R-1830-92 engines, first flown in 1944, operated by British European Airways. The flight was a scheduled service from BEA's base at Croydon Airport near London to Oslo Airport, Gardermoen. Gardermoen acted as Oslo's secondary airport to the more central Oslo Airport, Fornebu. However, BEA opted to use Gardermoen because it needed longer runways to operate the Vickers VC.1 Viking. The aircraft had a crew of five and carried ten passengers. Two of the passengers were Norwegian, the rest were British.

At 13:44 the radio operator asked air traffic control for permission to land using the low frequency radio range navigation system. Gardermoen confirmed, and noted that the Skytrain was the only aircraft in the area. There was no further radio communication between the aircraft and air traffic control. At the time the aircraft was heading southwards, parallel with the face. The commission concluded that the aircraft was under pilot control at the time of impact.

The impact of the accident caused the engines to be knocked off and they slid  past the airframe. Three of the crew members, the captain, first officer and radio operator, were killed in the collision.

Two of the passengers who were unhurt, one British and one Norwegian, walked from the wreck to the farm at Askheim, where they were able to notify about the accident by telephone. A crew of rescue workers were immediately dispatched from Gardermoen. They remained at the site for about four hours; the time was needed to get the steward free from the wreck. He and a passenger were severely injured and were freighted by car to Stensby Hospital. The rest of the passengers were able to walk by themselves and were treated for shock and cuts.

Investigation and cause
Norway's Ministry of Transport and Communications appointed an investigation commission on the day of the accident. It was led by Major Halle and otherwise consisted of Assistant Chief of Police Skalmerud, Engineer Truls Dahl, Pilot Odd Olsen, Captain Thorleif Eriksen and a representative for British aviation authorities. Their report was published in January 1947. They concluded with that the pilot was in full control of the aircraft and there were no faults with the aircraft, a controlled flight into terrain. The asserted the cause of the accident to improper airmanship, caused by insufficient training in radio range navigation combined with shortcomings in the equipment.

The aircraft's turn, road of engines and impact was heard by a witness. The passengers reported that they did not notice anything unusual until they saw spruce trees rushing past the window.

The radio range system had recently been calibrated twice and the commission found nothing wrong with the navigational aids. On the other hand, the aircraft's equipment had been turned to compass instead of antenna. This would have made the beam north of the cone of silence twenty degrees wide instead of four. Although not decisive, it was cited as giving the pilot a disadvantage in navigation. The aircraft's radio range equipment also lacked a marker beacon receiver, due to lack of sufficient parts. This forced the pilots to manually calculate the distance to the beacon.

References

Aviation accidents and incidents involving controlled flight into terrain
Accidents and incidents involving the Douglas C-47 Skytrain
Flight 530
Aviation accidents and incidents in Norway
Aviation accidents and incidents in 1946
1946 in Norway
Eidsvoll
Oslo Airport, Gardermoen